911 (nine hundred [and] eleven) is the integer following 910 and preceding 912.

It is a prime number, a Sophie Germain prime, and the sum of three consecutive primes (293 + 307 + 311). It is an Eisenstein prime with no imaginary part and real part of the form .  Since 913 is a semiprime, 911 is a Chen prime. It is also a centered decagonal number.

There are 911 inverse semigroups of order 7 

911 is obtained by concatenating its product of digits and sum of digits.

See also

 9-1-1, a North American emergency telephone number
 9/11, the September 11 attacks of 2001
 AD 911, a year
 Porsche 911, a sports car

References

Integers